Baikoetoe (also: Baikuku) is a village in Sarakreek resort in Brokopondo District in Suriname. It is located on Brokopondo Reservoir.

Nearby towns and villages include Mofina (17.0 nm), Warnakomoponafaja (17.4 nm), La Valere (16.1 nm), Adawai (7.0 nm), Copaivagogo (8.2 nm), Wittikamba (4.2 nm) and Zoewatta (1.0 nm). The unpaved road to the Afobakaweg has been renovated in 2009. Baikoetoe and neighbouring Banafow Kondre has a population of about 200 people.

References

Populated places in Brokopondo District